Washington Leandro Torres Trujillo (born 23 May 1984) is Chilean left back who currently plays in Segunda División de Chile side San Antonio Unido.

Honors

Club
Santiago Morning
 Primera B de Chile (1): 2005

References

External links

Washington Torres at Football Lineups

1984 births
Living people
Chilean footballers
Unión La Calera footballers
Ñublense footballers
Coquimbo Unido footballers
San Marcos de Arica footballers
Santiago Morning footballers
Chilean Primera División players
Primera B de Chile players
Association football defenders